The Zee Cine Award for Best Choreography Award is chosen by the jury and the winner is announced at the ceremony.

Awards
Here is a list of the award winners and the films for which they won.

See also
 Zee Cine Awardss
 Bollywood
 Cinema of India

Indian choreography awards
Film choreography awards